Romoaldo Braschi-Onesti (Cesena, 19 July 1753 – Rome, 30 April 1817) was a cardinal of the Roman Catholic Church.

Life

His uncle, Pope Pius VI, made him a cardinal on 18 December 1786, making him the last cardinal-nephew to date (in the narrow sense of a Pope appointing his nephew; if "cardinal-nephew" can mean any close relative, then the last was Giuseppe Pecci, appointed by his younger brother Pope Leo XIII.) A month later he became Cardinal-Deacon of San Nicola in Carcere. On 30 October 1800 he became Camerlengo of the Holy Roman Church, until 10 November 1801. 

From 1807 until his death, he was Archpriest of St. Peter's Basilica.

Between 1784 and 1817, he was also Grand Prior of Rome of the Sovereign Military Order of Malta.

His elder brother was Luigi Braschi Onesti, who built the Palazzo Braschi in Rome.

At his death, his body was buried in St. Peter's Basilica, while his praecordia were buried in the Chapel of the Madonna of Clemency in the Pantheon.

See also
Catholic Church in Italy

References

External links
Romoaldo Braschi-Onesti page at The Cardinals of the Holy Roman Church website

Cardinal-nephews
18th-century Italian cardinals
Members of the Holy Office
Camerlengos of the Holy Roman Church
1753 births
1817 deaths
Cardinals created by Pope Pius VI
19th-century Italian cardinals